Frederick John Westcott (26 March 1866 – 17 September 1941), best known by his stage name Fred Karno, was an English theatre impresario of the British music hall. As a comedian of slapstick he is credited with popularising the custard-pie-in-the-face gag. During the 1890s, in order to circumvent stage censorship, Karno developed a form of sketch comedy without dialogue.

Cheeky authority-defying playlets such as Jail Birds (1895) in which prisoners play tricks on warders and Early Birds (1899), showing the poverty and realities for the poor of London's East End, can be seen as precursors of movie silent comedy. Many of his comics subsequently worked in film and used Karno material throughout their work. Film producer Hal Roach stated: "Fred Karno is not only a genius, he is the man who originated slapstick comedy. We in Hollywood owe much to him."

Among the music hall comedians who worked for him were Charlie Chaplin and his understudy, Arthur Stanley Jefferson, who later adopted the name of Stan Laurel. These were alumni of his comedy companies all of whom trained at his headquarters, The Fun Factory, in Vaughan Road, Camberwell. Such was Karno's fame that his name became associated with any chaotic situation, and the disorganised volunteer soldiers of the Great War labelled themselves "Fred Karno's Army", a phrase still occasionally used in the UK to refer to a chaotic group or organisation. The phrase was also adapted into a trench song in the First World War, to the tune of the hymn "The Church's One Foundation". In the Second World War it was adapted as the Anthem of the Guinea Pig Club, the first line becoming "We are McIndoe's Army ...". The song also features in the musical comedy film Oh! What a Lovely War (1969).

Biography
Karno was born in Exeter, Devon, England, in 1866. His father was a cabinet maker, although Karno's first career was as a plumber's apprentice. A chance encounter at a gymnasium led to Karno taking up acrobatics, and around 1882 Karno joined forces with an older performer called Olvene, and ran away with the circus. He subsequently worked as a solo acrobat and as part of a troupe called The Four Aubreys. Whilst with the Aubreys he met Edith Cuthbert who worked in the box office at Stockport Theatre Royal. They married in 1889. In 1891 his son, Fred Karno Jr. (born Frederick Arthur Westcott) was born. As a young man he had busked at Molesey near Tagg's Island on London's River Thames and in 1912 he leased the island and the existing hotel. He demolished the original hotel and hired architect Frank Matcham to build The Karsino. With the advent of cinema, the music hall's popularity declined and as a result of this decline, Karno went bankrupt in 1927.

On 27 May 1927 his wife Edith, from whom he had been separated since 1904, died in her sleep of diabetes. Karno then was able to marry his long-time partner, Marie Moore. Karno went to the US in September 1929, and was hired by the Hal Roach Studios as a writer-director, thanks to the support of one of his former protégés, Stan Laurel. However, his stay at the studio was brief and unsuccessful. Hal Roach later claimed that Karno's main abilities were as a producer, although in reality Karno appears to have been the victim of cost cutting at the studio following the Wall Street Crash of 1929. He left the studio in February 1930 and returned to England later that Spring. On his return to Britain, Karno launched a show called Laffs which was later licensed by George Black (producer) as the basis of shows for the newly formed Crazy Gang (comedy group). He later helped to write and produce several short films, some of which starred members of the Gang. In 1932 he returned to the theatre with a show called Real Life. a show which launched the career of Frank Randle, Karno's second son Leslie also appeared in the show.

Karno spent his last years in southwest England in the village of Lilliput, Dorset, as a part-owner of an off-licence, and died there in 1941 from diabetes, aged 75.

Legacy

Karno was hugely influential on comedy – not least in recruiting and training a generation of comics who went on to fame and fortune in their own right, notably: Stan Laurel, Charlie Chaplin, Will Hay, Fred Kitchen (entertainer), Syd Walker, Sydney Chaplin, Eric Campbell (actor), Sandy Powell (comedian), Max Miller (comedian), Frank Randle, Billie Ritchie, Billy Bennett (comedian), Walter Groves, Billy Reeves, Jimmy Nervo, of Nervo and Knox, and many more. These comedians were the backbone of British variety throughout the first half of the twentieth century, and many were recruited by fledgling studios in Hollywood as the cream of physical slapstick comedy.

Karno was also an innovator: he brought slapstick circus comedy to the music hall and developed possibly the first use of the revolve in Britain, bought together troupes of comics and in so doing developed sketch comedy; he was instrumental in establishing copyright protections for stage productions against the threat from film; and was a pioneer of adding musical accompaniment to stage slapstick.    

Karno's reputation and legacy was significantly tarnished by a salacious biography: Master of Mirth and Tears (1971) by J. P. Gallagher, but this text has now been largely discredited by the 2021 biography by David B Crump: Fred Karno, the Legend Behind the Laughter.     

The American writer Trav S.D., author of No Applause, Just Throw Money: The Book That Made Vaudeville Famous, has proclaimed Crump's biography as "definitive, full of original primary research and then digested and turned into perceptive and entertaining prose", adding "there is a tendency to restrict Karno mentally to the British music hall in which he was so central, and to associate him almost entirely with his two best known creative progeny (Chaplin and Laurel). But that doesn’t do him enough justice. Given the minor fact that between them Chaplin and Laurel largely wrote the rules for screen comedy, it might be well to think of Karno as a Socrates to their Aristotle and Xenophon. In that respect, he has hands over all of 20th century culture. Crump’s strongly worded formulation is the one we should all now go by, calling Karno “the most significant exponent of sketch comedy and physical slapstick the stage has ever seen”. 
Karno's houseboat, the Astoria, on the River Thames at Hampton, Middlesex, is now used as a recording studio by Pink Floyd's David Gilmour.

On 30 September 2012, the Music Hall Guild of Great Britain and America unveiled a commemorative blue plaque to Karno at his former studios at 38 Southwell Road, Camberwell, in south London.

Karno's role in Charlie Chaplin's rise to fame was highlighted in the biopic Chaplin (1992), where Karno was played by British actor John Thaw. The film included a brief routine based on Karno's sketch Mumming Birds.

Karno's comedy companies were the basis of a trilogy of novels by Chris England.

References

Further reading

(Subscription required.) 
 (Available through The Times archive. Subscription required.)

External links
 Fred Karno, Tagg's Island and the Astoria
The Charlie Hall Picture Archive
Fred Karno Website
 
Fred Karno at the Music Hall Guild of Great Britain
Plays by Fred Karno on Great War Theatre website

1866 births
1941 deaths
Businesspeople from Exeter
English theatre managers and producers
Music hall performers
Deaths from diabetes